Chin Timur Khan was a general of the Mughal Empire. He was the son of Babur's uncle Sultan Ahmad Alaq. He was in service of both Sultan Said Khan and Mansur Khan, but eventually fled to Babur of Mughal Empire in India. Timur was a commander under the service of Emperor Babur during his conquests. At the Battle of Khanwa, he commanded the center wing, which was also led by the emperor in person. Died of violent dysentery in Agra and was buried there.

References

Mughal generals
1529 deaths
Year of birth missing
People from Samarkand